, also known by his pseudonym Pixel, is a Japanese indie game developer. He is best known for developing , which has been remade into many versions.

Career
His most popular work, Cave Story, is a freeware PC platform game released in 2004 that was created entirely by himself over the period of five years. The game received widespread praise from critics and in July 2006 appeared at the top of Super PLAY's list of the 50 best freeware games of all time.

Amaya's other work includes the game Ikachan which he released in 2000, as well as many other low-profile games. His current projects, if any, are unknown. Before working on Kero Blaster, he was working on a game titled "Rockfish", which was intended to be finished sometime in 2012. The project was put on indefinite hiatus, and was likely canceled. Amaya was credited with the story concept for Nicklas Nygren's NightSky. In May 2014, Amaya released Kero Blaster, a side-scrolling platform shooter game. This game was Amaya's first major work since the release of Cave Story. In October 2015, Amaya updated Kero Blaster, under the name Kero Blaster ZANGYOU or overtime mode, featuring a new story, levels, and overall greater difficulty. In 2021, Amaya was credited for assisting in the development of MIYAKOpubl's game Haru to Shura.

Audio software
Amaya has created various audio and music composition software. All his music composition software uses a piano roll editing interface.

Org Maker is the software used to create music for the lightweight .org format, which was used in Cave Story.

He is continuously developing the successor to Org Maker, the freeware audio editing suite PxTone. Users can create their own audio samples and compose music using PxTone Collage.

Games

 Ikachan (2000)
Ikachan 3DS (2013)
 Azarashi (2001)
Azarashi iOS (2012)
Glasses (Megane) (2003)
 Cave Story (2004)
 Cave Story Wii (2010)
 Cave Story DSi (2010)
 Cave Story+ (2011)
 Cave Story 3D (2011)
 Cave Story 3DS (2012)
 Guxt (2007)
 NightSky (2011) - story
 Pink Hour (2014)
 Kero Blaster (2014)
 Pink Heaven (2015)

References

External links
 Daisuke Amaya's personal page 
 Challenging Freeware Classic Cave Story Makes Wii Debut, Gus Mastrapa, Wired, March 22, 2010
 
 The Cave Story story, The Brainy Gamer, March 29, 2010

Japanese video game designers
Japanese video game programmers
Living people
1977 births
Indie video game developers